The NWA United National Championship (often abbreviated to UN Championship) was a professional wrestling championship sanctioned by the National Wrestling Alliance, and best known for being defended in All Japan Pro Wrestling. It was unified into the Triple Crown Heavyweight Championship, along with the PWF World Heavyweight Championship and the NWA International Heavyweight Championship, in 1989. The original belt remained in use for the Triple Crown until 2013.

Title history

Combined reigns

See also
List of National Wrestling Alliance championships
Triple Crown Heavyweight Championship
NWA International Heavyweight Championship
PWF Heavyweight Championship

Footnotes

References

External links
Wrestling-Titles.com

All Japan Pro Wrestling championships
Heavyweight wrestling championships
National Wrestling Alliance championships
NWA Hollywood Wrestling championships
National professional wrestling championships
Japan Pro Wrestling Alliance championships